The superior laryngeal vein is a vein which drains the larynx into the superior thyroid vein.

Veins of the head and neck